

594001–594100 

|-id=012
| 594012 Bulavina ||  || Daria Arturovna Bulavina (born 1988), a Russian photographer and member of the Union of Artists of Russia. || 
|-id=032
| 594032 Reyhersamuel ||  ||  (1635–1714), a German mathematician and astronomer at University of Kiel, where he was first to introduce astronomy as a scientific discipline. || 
|}

594101–594200 

|-bgcolor=#f2f2f2
| colspan=4 align=center | 
|}

594201–594300 

|-bgcolor=#f2f2f2
| colspan=4 align=center | 
|}

594301–594400 

|-bgcolor=#f2f2f2
| colspan=4 align=center | 
|}

594401–594500 

|-bgcolor=#f2f2f2
| colspan=4 align=center | 
|}

594501–594600 

|-bgcolor=#f2f2f2
| colspan=4 align=center | 
|}

594601–594700 

|-bgcolor=#f2f2f2
| colspan=4 align=center | 
|}

594701–594800 

|-id=782
| 594782 Kacperwierzchos ||  || Kacper Wierzchoś (born 1988), a Polish astronomer with the Catalina Sky Survey, who is a discoverer of minor planets and comets including the co-discovery of Earth's temporary satellite,  (Src, WP-pt). || 
|}

594801–594900 

|-bgcolor=#f2f2f2
| colspan=4 align=center | 
|}

594901–595000 

|-id=913
| 594913 ꞌAylóꞌchaxnim ||  || ꞌAylóꞌchaxnim means "Venus Girl" in the language of the Luiseño people who are indigenous to the coastal area of southern California where the discovering Palomar Observatory is located. The name alludes to the fact that the orbit of this asteroid is entirely contained within that of the planet Venus. || 
|}

References 

594001-595000